Sandbanks Provincial Park is a provincial park on the island of Newfoundland in the province of Newfoundland and Labrador. It is located on the southwest coast, approximately 150 km from the Trans-Canada Highway near the town of Burgeo, less than three hours from Corner Brook. The park is known for its expansive sandy beaches and dunes.

One path leads to a lookout at Cow Head.

Biology and ecology 
The sand dunes are easily eroded. Visitors are encouraged to stay on designated trails.

Flora 
Sandbanks is home to Lathyrus japonicus, otherwise known as the beach pea. The fragile sand dunes are covered with beach grass (Ammophila breviligulata).

Fauna 
The piping plover, a near-threatened species of bird, nests on the beaches and in the sand dunes of the park. The park and surrounding area is an important bird migration route.

Notable visitors 
Farley Mowat, who lived in Burgeo during the 1960s and wrote several books about the area, often visited the park with his dogs.

Painter Christopher Pratt was a frequent visitor and depicted the beach in the painting West of Sandbanks: Endless Summer.

Newfoundland adventurer, author, and YouTuber Justin Barbour has also spent time at Sandbanks.

See also 

 List of protected areas of Newfoundland and Labrador
 List of Canadian protected areas

References

External links
 
 Parks NL campsite booking system - Sandbanks

IUCN Category II
Provincial parks of Newfoundland and Labrador